FWX is the tenth studio album by progressive metal band Fates Warning, released on October 5, 2004 through Metal Blade Records; their last album on the label until re-signing in 2019. It is also the band's last studio album to feature drummer Mark Zonder.

Track listing

Personnel

Ray Alder – vocals, production
Jim Matheos – guitar, keyboard, programming, production
Mark Zonder – drums
Joey Vera – bass
Phil Magnotti – engineering, mixing
Andy VanDette – mastering

References

External links
FWX  at fateswarning.com
Fates Warning - 2004 - "FWX" at ProgressoR

Fates Warning albums
2004 albums
Metal Blade Records albums